Martha Joan Douglass (February 9, 1924 — January 20, 2016) was an American political figure who served in the Ohio House of Representatives. She lost in 1974 to future United States Senator Sherrod Brown.

Joan Douglass died in Mansfield's independent living community The Waterford at the age of 91.

External links
Profile on the Ohio Ladies Gallery website

References

Republican Party members of the Ohio House of Representatives
Women state legislators in Ohio
Politicians from Mansfield, Ohio
1924 births
2016 deaths
21st-century American women